David Lescay (born 19 February 1989) is a retired Cuban sprinter. He represented his country at the 2010 World Indoor Championships without advancing from the first round.

International competitions

Personal bests
Outdoor
100 metres – 10.20 (+1.5 m/s, Havana 2009)
200 metres – 20.83 (-0.9 m/s, Havana 2009)
Indoor
60 metres – 6.79 (Doha 2010)

References

1989 births
Living people
Cuban male sprinters
Athletes (track and field) at the 2011 Pan American Games
Pan American Games competitors for Cuba
20th-century Cuban people
21st-century Cuban people